Shaker Square is a station on the RTA Blue and Green Lines in Cleveland, Ohio. It is the first station west of the junction of the Blue and Green Lines and thus serves as a transfer point between the two lines.

The station is at street level on the western side of Shaker Square. It marks the dividing point between the line's grade-separated portion and its at-grade portion, with trains running on a grade separated right-of-way west of this station to Tower City and running at-grade along the medians of boulevards east of this station.

Fares are collected on the train for passengers leaving the train westbound or boarding the train eastbound.

There is no parking directly at the Shaker Square station, though there is parking in the area, and parking is also available at the Blue Line Drexmore station at the eastern edge of the Shaker Square development area.

History
On April 11, 1920, the predecessor of what is now the Blue Line began operation through Moreland Circle, then an empty traffic circle.
The junction between the Shaker Boulevard line and the line along Van Aken (then named South Moreland) Boulevard was in the middle of Moreland Circle, Thus, the station stop was located on the western end of the circle.

Development of Moreland Circle into Shaker Square began 1927, when construction started on the planned suburban shopping center. The circle was transformed into more of a square (actually an octagon),
and the rail junction was moved about one-quarter mile to the east. Conductors on the train were instructed to begin call the stop “Shaker Square” as of August 29, 1928. The Shaker Square development was completed in 1929, but no provision was made for an extensive station facility at the location. The station consisted of small wooden shelters on the western side of the square.

In 1949 Rapid Transit officials proposed replacing the shelters with a combination three-story passenger station and retail complex to straddle the tracks at the western end of Shaker Square. However, Shaker Square merchants opposed the plan, and proposed an alternative smaller station, which was eventually built and opened in October 1952. The wooden shelters were replaced by a coffee shop with an adjoining sheltered passenger platform along the westbound side, and a concrete and steel waiting area along the eastbound side.

This station lasted until 1984 when a new station was proposed. The result was two brick and glass pavilions designed in a Georgian style to match the existing architecture of the Shaker Square buildings that surround them. The old coffee shop was retained, but a new exterior was built around it. Designed by Cleveland architect William Gould, the new station opened in July 1986. It won design awards from both Cleveland and Ohio architectural societies.

A proposal to rent the coffee shop space for a McDonald's restaurant in 1996 met stiff opposition and was eventually abandoned.

Further changes were made to the 1986 design as a result of the overall upgrade of the Shaker Square right-of-way in 2006. The station buildings were enlarged, and wheelchair lifts were provided to provide car boarding accessibility. The new station was opened on September 20, 2006.

Station layout

Notable places nearby
 Shaker Square—historic shopping center featuring restaurants and retail outlets.
 Halle Brothers Shaker Square department store

References

External links

Blue Line (RTA Rapid Transit)
Green Line (RTA Rapid Transit)
Railway stations in the United States opened in 1920
1920 establishments in Ohio
Buckeye-Shaker